Jorge Gomes may refer to:

 Jorge Gomes (politician) (born 1951), Portuguese politician and businessman
 Jorge Gomes (footballer) (born 1954), Brazilian football striker
 Jorge Gomes (swimmer) (born 1972), Angolan swimmer
 Jorge Gomes Mangrinha A.S.C. Huambo, Angolan football club also known as JGM

See also
 Jorge Gómez (disambiguation)
 Jorge Vieira (footballer, born 1898), Jorge Gomes Vieira, Portuguese football left-back